Michael Keith Johnson (born October 3, 1975) is a Canadian former professional baseball pitcher who pitched all or part of five seasons in Major League Baseball (MLB), and also played in Nippon Professional Baseball (NPB), KBO League, and the Chinese Professional Baseball League (CPBL).

Career
Johnson was selected by the Toronto Blue Jays in the 1993 Major League Baseball draft, then made his MLB debut on April 6, 1997 with the Baltimore Orioles going on to play for the Orioles (1997) and Montreal Expos (1997–2001).

He was a member of the Team Canada baseball team at the 2004 Summer Olympics, where they finished in fourth place in the tournament.

Johnson played in the Texas Rangers, Los Angeles Dodgers, and San Francisco Giants organizations from 2001 through 2003, before signing with the Expos again in 2004.

In 2006, Johnson played with Somerset of the independent Atlantic League. In 2007, he played for the Edmonton Cracker-Cats of the Northern League. In 2008, he played for the CPBL's La New Bears and won the winningest pitcher and the MVP at the regular season.

On March 7, 2009 he pitched again for Canada in the World Baseball Classic against the USA. For the 2009 season, he signed to play for the SK Wyverns in South Korea after an interval of four years, but was dismissed in April having appeared in just two games. He then signed with the Edmonton Capitals of the Golden Baseball League, for whom he finished the season. He split the 2010 season between the Capitals and Yuma Scorpions.

He is presently a coaching instructor in Edmonton for the St. Francis Xavier high-school baseball Academy.

External links

1975 births
Living people
Baltimore Orioles players
Baseball people from Alberta
Baseball players at the 2004 Summer Olympics
Baseball players at the 2008 Summer Olympics
Baseball players at the 2011 Pan American Games
Canadian expatriate baseball players in Japan
Canadian expatriate baseball players in South Korea
Canadian expatriate baseball players in Taiwan
Canadian expatriate baseball players in the United States
Edmonton Capitals players
Edmonton Cracker-Cats players
Edmonton Trappers players
Fresno Grizzlies players
Gulf Coast Blue Jays players
Hagerstown Suns players
Harrisburg Senators players
High school baseball coaches
KBO League pitchers
Kia Tigers players
La New Bears players
Las Vegas 51s players
Major League Baseball pitchers
Major League Baseball players from Canada
Medicine Hat Blue Jays players
Montreal Expos players
Nippon Professional Baseball pitchers
Oklahoma RedHawks players
Olympic baseball players of Canada
Osaka Kintetsu Buffaloes players
Ottawa Lynx players
Pan American Games gold medalists for Canada
Pan American Games medalists in baseball
SSG Landers players
Somerset Patriots players
Sportspeople from Edmonton
World Baseball Classic players of Canada
Yuma Scorpions players
2009 World Baseball Classic players
Medalists at the 2011 Pan American Games
Canadian expatriate baseball players in Australia
Canadian expatriate baseball players in Puerto Rico
Leones de Ponce players